The 1955–56 Connecticut Huskies men's basketball team represented the University of Connecticut in the 1955–56 collegiate men's basketball season. The Huskies completed the season with a 17–11 overall record. The Huskies were members of the Yankee Conference, where they ended the season with a 7–1 record. They were the Yankee Conference regular season champions and made it to the sweet sixteen in the 1956 NCAA Division I men's basketball tournament. The Huskies played their home games at Hugh S. Greer Field House in Storrs, Connecticut, and were led by tenth-year head coach Hugh Greer.

Schedule 

|-
!colspan=12 style=""| Regular season

|-
!colspan=12 style=""| NCAA tournament

Schedule Source:

References 

UConn Huskies men's basketball seasons
Connecticut
Connecticut
1955 in sports in Connecticut
1956 in sports in Connecticut